Numinous is a term derived from the Latin numen, meaning "arousing spiritual or religious emotion; mysterious or awe-inspiring." The term was given its present sense by the German theologian and philosopher Rudolf Otto in his influential 1917 German book The Idea of the Holy. He also used the phrase mysterium tremendum as another description for the phenomenon. Otto's concept of the numinous influenced thinkers including Carl Jung, Mircea Eliade, and C. S. Lewis. It has been applied to theology, psychology, religious studies, literary analysis, and descriptions of psychedelic experiences.

Etymology
Numinous was derived in the 17th century from the Latin numen, meaning a "deity or spirit presiding over a thing or space." It describes the power or presence or realisation of a divinity. It is etymologically unrelated to Immanuel Kant's noumenon, a Greek term referring to an unknowable reality underlying all things.

Rudolf Otto
The word was given its present sense by the German theologian and philosopher Rudolf Otto in his influential 1917 book Das Heilige, which appeared in English as The Idea of the Holy in 1923.

Otto writes that while the concept of "the holy" is often used to convey moral perfection—and does entail this—it contains another distinct element, beyond the ethical sphere, for which he uses the term numinous. He explains the numinous as a "non-rational, non-sensory experience or feeling whose primary and immediate object is outside the self." This mental state "presents itself as ganz Andere, wholly other, a condition absolutely sui generis and incomparable whereby the human being finds himself utterly abashed."

Otto argues that because the numinous is irreducible and sui generis it cannot be defined in terms of other concepts or experiences, and that the reader must therefore be "guided and led on by consideration and discussion of the matter through the ways of his own mind, until he reach the point at which 'the numinous' in him perforce begins to stir... In other words, our X cannot, strictly speaking, be taught, it can only be evoked, awakened in the mind." Chapters 4 to 6 are devoted to attempting to evoke the numinous and its various aspects.

Using Latin, he describes it as a mystery that is at once terrifying (tremendum) and fascinating (fascinans). He writes:

Later use of the concept 
Otto's use of the term as referring to a characteristic of religious experience was influential among certain intellectuals of the subsequent generation. For example, "numinous" as understood by Otto was a frequently quoted concept in the writings of Carl Jung, and C. S. Lewis. Lewis described the numinous experience in The Problem of Pain as follows:

Jung applied the concept of the numinous to psychology and psychotherapy, arguing it was therapeutic and brought greater self-understanding, and stating that to him religion was about a "careful and scrupulous observation... of the numinosum". The notion of the numinous and the wholly Other were also central to the religious studies of ethnologist Mircea Eliade. Mysterium tremendum, another phrase coined by Otto to describe the numinous, is presented by Aldous Huxley in The Doors of Perception in this way:

In a book-length scholarly treatment of the subject in fantasy literature, Chris Brawley devotes chapters to the concept in "The Rime of the Ancient Mariner" by Samuel Taylor Coleridge, in Phantastes by George Macdonald, in the Chronicles of Narnia by C. S. Lewis, and The Lord of the Rings by J. R. R. Tolkien; and in work by Algernon Blackwood and Ursula Le Guin (e.g., The Centaur and Buffalo Gals, Won't You Come Out Tonight, respectively).

Neuroscientist Christof Koch has described awe from experiences such as entering a cathedral, saying he gets "a feeling of luminosity out of the numinous," though he does not hold the Catholic religious beliefs with which he was raised.

In a 2010 article titled "James Cameron's Cathedral: Avatar Revives the Religious Spectacle" published in the Journal of Religion and Film, academic Craig Detweiler describes how the global blockbuster movie Avatar "traffics in Rudolph Otto’s notion of the numinous, the wholly other that operates beyond reason. [...]  As spectacle, Avatar remains virtually critic proof, a trip to Otto’s mysterium tremendum et fascinans." Cameron himself mentioned this in a 2022 interview with BBC Radio 1 when trying to explain the first movie's success, saying "There was that element that I call — borrowing from Carl Sagan — the numinous." Sagan specifically explored the numinous concept in his 1985 novel Contact.

Psychologist Susan Blackmore describes both mystical experiences and psychedelic experiences as numinous. In 2009, Czech psychiatrist Stanislav Grof re-released his 1975 book Realms of the Human Unconscious under the title LSD: Doorway to the Numinous: The Groundbreaking Psychedelic Research into Realms of the Human Unconscious. In his 2018 book How to Change Your Mind, journalist Michael Pollan describes his experience trying the powerful psychedelic substance 5-MeO-DMT, including the following reflection on his experience of ego dissolution:

See also

 Analytical psychology
 Argument from religious experience
 Religious ecstasy
 Religious experience
 Sacred
 Sacred–profane dichotomy
 Sense of wonder
 Soul flight

References and notes

Further reading
 Allen, Douglas. 2009. "Phenomenology of Religion § Rudolf Otto." Pp. 182–207 in The Routledge Companion to the Study of Religion (2nd ed.), edited by J. Hinnells. Abingdon, Oxon: Routledge. . Pp. 192f, passim.
 Brawley, Chris. 2014. Nature and the Numinous in Mythopoeic Fantasy Literature, Critical Explorations in Science Fiction and Fantasy vol. 46, edited by D.E. Palumbo and & C.W. Sullivan III. Jefferson, NC: McFarland. . [Critical treatment with extensive reference to and use of the titular concept.]
 see, e.g., pp. 71–92, "'Further Up and Further In': Apocalypse and the New Narnia in C.S. Lewis's 'The Last Battle';" and passim.
 Duriez, Colin. 2003. Tolkien and C.S. Lewis: The Gift of Friendship. Mahwah, NJ: Paulist Press. . pp. 1, 179–80.
 Gooch, Todd A. 2000. The Numinous and Modernity: An Interpretation of Rudolf Otto's Philosophy of Religion. Berlin, DEU: Walter de Gruyter. .
 Miranda, Punita. 2018. "Numinous and Religious Experience in the Psychology of Carl Jung." Diálogos Junguianos [Jungian Dialogues] 3(1): 110–33.
 Otto, Rudolph (1917). Das Heilige - Über das Irrationale in der Idee des Göttlichen und sein Verhältnis zum Rationalen. Breslau.
 —— 1923. The Idea of the Holy: An Inquiry into the Non-Rational Factor in the Idea of the Divine and its Relation to the Rational, translated by J. W. Harvey. London: Oxford University Press. Internet Archive: in.ernet.dli.2015.22259.
 Oubre, Oubre. 2013. Instinct and Revelation: Reflections on the Origins of Numinous Perception. Abingdon, Oxon: Routledge. .

Concepts in aesthetics
Concepts in metaphysics
Concepts in the philosophy of mind
Holiness
Metaphysics of mind
Mysticism
Psychological concepts
Religious philosophical concepts
Religious practices
Religious terminology
Spirituality